Zehra Fazal is an American voice actress, known for voicing Nadia Rizavi in Voltron: Legendary Defender and Halo and Bluebird in Young Justice: Outsiders. Greg Weisman, the co-creator of Young Justice: Outsiders said "I wrote the role with her in mind. She plays Halo, but she also plays about a dozen other characters."

Career
Prior to her voice acting career, Fazal, who is Muslim-American and of Pakistani descent, was known for her irreverent comedy often poking fun at Muslim identity. Her one-woman musical comedy show Headscarf and the Angry Bitch which she described as partly fictional and partly autobiographical, created Muslim parodies of holiday comedy songs The Ramadan Song instead of The Hanukkah Song and discussed living in America with a "hyphenated identity." Fazal, who self describes as "the Muslim Weird Al", explains that the show explores the fact that "the definition of what it is to be Muslim is expanding and it's okay to be vocal about it." She created the show's character, Zed Headscarf, as "her tougher, bolder, prouder side" partly in response to post-9/11 Islamaphobia she encountered. Her performance won the "best solo performance award" at the Capital Fringe Festival in 2009 and was sold out throughout its New York International Fringe Festival run in 2010.

Fazal has also portrayed Adolf Hitler in an adaptation of Yukio Mishima’s play, My Friend Hitler. She studied with Japan’s Takarazuka Revue Company as a research intern in 2004. On her return to the U.S., she translated and staged Takarazuka Revue's The Rose of Versailles at Wellesley College where she was a student. Fazal explains "I have a knack for taking something that already exists and making it fit into a new mold." Fazal also portrayed doctor Amanda Jain in the video comedy series F#@K I Love U.

Personal life
Fazal has a B.A. from Wellesley College.  She speaks Japanese, French and Urdu. Fazal is a passionate supporter of Paani Project, a nonprofit that works with community partners and institutions in the United States and Pakistan to help alleviate clean water inaccessibility, advocate for gender equity, and address a variety of pressing health disparities in rural South Asian communities.

As a kid, she was a fan of the Disney animated show Darkwing Duck; she drew on inspiration on the titular character for her performance as General Yunan on Disney's Amphibia.

Filmography

Animation

Web series

Film

Video games

Awards and nominations

References

External links
 
 

Living people
American stage actresses
American people of Pakistani descent
American video game actresses
American voice actresses
American women comedians
20th-century American actresses
20th-century American comedians
21st-century American actresses
21st-century American comedians
American Muslims
Muslim female comedians
Year of birth missing (living people)